Middle Valley is an unincorporated community located along Middle Valley Road and County Route 513 (West Mill Road) in Washington Township, Morris County, New Jersey. It is near Long Valley in the valley of the South Branch Raritan River. The Middle Valley Historic District was listed on the state and national registers of historic places in 1989 and 1990.

History
Middle Valley was initially settled between 1750 and 1780. The oldest part of the David Miller House was probably built .

By the 1860's, the community had several established businesses, including the Dufford Mills and the general store built  by David Miller. The Chapel, now the Middle Valley Community Center, is built over the stone foundation of that general store.

Historic district

The Middle Valley Historic District is a  historic district encompassing the community along West Mill, Middle Valley, and Beacon Hill roads. It was added to the National Register of Historic Places on September 25, 1990, for its significance in agriculture, architecture, commerce, industry, community planning and development. The district includes 88 contributing buildings, three contributing structures, and 16 contributing sites.

Buttonball Farm at 25 Middle Valley Road was built  with Italianate style. The William Naughright House was built  with Queen Anne style and features scalloped shingles and elaborate corbels and balusters on the porch. The Levi Farrow House, built , features ornate scrollwork under the eaves and windows with projected round arch molding.

Gallery

See also
 National Register of Historic Places listings in Morris County, New Jersey
 German Valley Historic District
 Lower Valley, New Jersey

References

External links
 
 

Washington Township, Morris County, New Jersey
Unincorporated communities in Morris County, New Jersey
Unincorporated communities in New Jersey
National Register of Historic Places in Morris County, New Jersey
Historic districts on the National Register of Historic Places in New Jersey
New Jersey Register of Historic Places
Historic American Buildings Survey in New Jersey